This is a list of aircraft of the Fleet Air Arm (FAA).

On 1 April 1918 the Royal Naval Air Service (RNAS) was merged with the Royal Flying Corps (RFC) to form the Royal Air Force (RAF) which directly operated and controlled all naval aircraft. On 1 April 1924 the Fleet Air Arm of the Royal Air Force was created as a distinct component of the RAF, which existed until 24 May 1939 when command of the Fleet Air Arm was transferred back to Royal Navy control. 
Coastal Command patrol aircraft, including most large seaplanes, remained with the RAF despite their operations in a naval environment. Prototypes were largely under the control of the Air Ministry and not the Fleet Air Arm until their introduction into service.

Aircraft
Acronyms in table 
ASW; Anti-submarine warfare
AEW; Airborne Early Warning 
ECM; Electronic counter measures
EW;  Electronic Warfare aircraft

Helicopters to support the Royal Marines
 Aerospatiale Gazelle
 Agusta-Bell Sioux
 Westland-Bell Sioux
 Westland Lynx
 Westland Scout

Airships and balloons

 List of British airships
 Barrage balloons

UAVs and drones

 Airspeed Queen Wasp
 Boeing Insitu ScanEagle
 Curtiss Queen Seamew
 de Havilland DH.82 Queen Bee
 Miles Queen Martinet

Gliders
 Akaflieg München Mü13 – One former Luftwaffe (1945–1957)
 DFS SG 38 Schulgleiter – Three (1947–1952)
 Eliotts Olympia I – One (1946–1955)
 DFS Kranich I – One (1946–1960)
 DFS Kranich II – One (1946–1953)
 Schneider Grunau Baby – Six (1946–1952)
 Slingsby Cadet – One (1946–1949)
 Slingsby Prefect – One (1953–1956)

Weapons of the Fleet Air Arm

Air-to-air missiles
 AMRAAM: Medium-range air-to-air missile – Carried by the Sea Harrier.
 Firestreak: Air-to-air missile – Carried by the Sea Venom and Sea Vixen (retired).
 Red Top: Air-to-air missile – Carried by the Sea Vixen (retired).
 Sidewinder: Short-range air-to-air missiles – Carried by the Buccaneer. Phantom, Scimitar and Sea Harrier.
 Sparrow: Medium-range air-to-air missile – Carried by the Phantom

Air-to-surface missiles
 AS.11: air-to-surface anti-tank, anti-ship missile. Carried by the Wessex and Wasp helicopter (retired).
 AS.12: Air-to-surface anti-ship missile. Carried by the Wasp and Wessex helicopters (retired).
 Bullpup: Air-to-surface missile – Carried by the Scimitar and Sea Vixen (retired).
 Lightweight Multirole Missile
 Martel – Carried by the Buccaneer and Sea Harrier.
 Sea Eagle: Anti-ship missile, carried by the Buccaneer and Sea Harrier.
 Sea Skua: Anti-ship missile, normally carried by the Lynx.
 Sea Venom: Anti-ship missile, on order for use on the Wildcat.

Nuclear weapons 1950 to 2000
 Red Beard nuclear bomb – Carried by the Buccaneer, Scimitar and Sea Vixen.
 WE.177 nuclear bomb – Carried by the Buccaneer, Sea Harrier and Sea Vixen.
 WE.177 nuclear depth charge – Carried by the Westland Lynx, Wasp and Wessex helicopters.

Unguided rockets
 2-inch RP - Air-to-air, air-to-surface rockets. Carried by the Buccaneer and Sea Vixen.
 SNEB – 68-mm (2.7-inch) air-to-surface rockets. Carried by the Buccaneer, Phantom, Sea Harrier and Sea Vixen.
 RP-3 – 3-inch (76-mm) air-to-surface rockets. Carried by the Attacker. Firefly, Scimitar, Sea Fury, Sea Hawk, Sea Hurricane, Sea Vixen, Swordfish, Tarpon/Avenger.

Torpedoes
 18" Mark 30 torpedo – Carried by the Fairey Gannet and Westland Whirlwind helicopter.
 British 18 inch torpedo – Carried by the Blackburn Firebrand.
 Mark 24 mine
 Mark 43 torpedo
 Mark 44 torpedo – Carried by the Westland Sea king, Wasp, Wessex and Whirlwind helicopters.
 Mark 46 torpedo – Carried by the Westland Lynx, Sea King, Wasp, Wessex and Whirlwind helicopters.
 Sting Ray torpedo – Carried by the Westland Lynx and Sea King helicopters.

Free fall bombs
 BL755

See also
List of aircraft of the Royal Air Force
List of aircraft of the Royal Naval Air Service
List of aircraft of the Army Air Corps (United Kingdom)

References

External links

Fleet Arm Arm Archive: Aircraft
Fleet Air Arm - Phantom F4K

Fleet Air Arm aircraft
Fleet Air Arm
United Kingdom Fleet Air Arm, List of aircraft of the